Käyhkö is a Finnish surname. Notable people with the surname include:

Karri Käyhkö (1937–2020), Finnish swimmer
Tauno Käyhkö (born 1950), Finnish-Canadian ski jumper
Tomas Käyhkö, Finish bowler

Finnish-language surnames